Kittipong Phuthawchueak (born September 3, 1989), or simply known as Ton, is a Thai professional footballer who plays as a goalkeeper for  BG Pathum United and the Thailand national team.

Honours

Club
BG Pathum United
 Thailand Champions Cup: 2022

International
Thailand
 AFF Championship (1): 2022

References

External links

1989 births
Living people
Kittipong Phuthawchueak
Kittipong Phuthawchueak
Association football goalkeepers
Kittipong Phuthawchueak
Kittipong Phuthawchueak
Kittipong Phuthawchueak
Kittipong Phuthawchueak
Kittipong Phuthawchueak
Kittipong Phuthawchueak
Kittipong Phuthawchueak